Agelanthus keilii is a species of hemiparasitic plant in the family Loranthaceae, which is native to Rwanda, Tanzania and Burundi.

Description 
A description of the plant is given in Govaerts et al.

Habitat/ecology
A. keilii is found at forest edges and wooded grassland on Ficus, Bridelia, and Combretum, at altitudes of between 1,000 and 1,450 m. Seed is dispersed long distance by means of birds.

Threats 
The places in which A. keilii has been found are all unprotected. Its habitat is declining due to conversion of forest edges and grassland for agriculture, and harvesting for firewood.

References

Flora of Tanzania
Flora of Burundi
Flora of Rwanda
keilii